The Thessaloniki Waterbus, operated as Karavakia, is a ferry service connecting central Thessaloniki with the nearby beach towns of Peraia and Neoi Epivates, in the Thessaloniki metropolitan area. It operates a fleet of three ships (and ) on a single 50-minute route.

See also
Transport in Greece
Greek shipping

References

External links

Transport in Thessaloniki
Thessaloniki (regional unit)
Ferry companies of Greece
Transport companies established in 2018
Companies based in Thessaloniki